The Garbage Picking Field Goal Kicking Philadelphia Phenomenon (also known simply as The Philadelphia Phenomenon)  is a 1998 American television movie starring Tony Danza from Walt Disney Pictures.

Plot
Barney Gorman (Tony Danza) works hard as a garbageman in Philadelphia, but his career indirectly embarrasses his family. Barney's frustration is made worse by being a fan of the Philadelphia Eagles, who are mired in a slump. Due to a sticky lever on his garbage truck, Barney has (without realizing it) developed a very strong kick. One day at the city dump, Barney kicks a water jug extremely far and catches the attention of a group of Eagles executives, who are scouting the location for land to build a new stadium. The Eagles coach offers Barney a job as the team's new kicker, which the owner feels is an excellent publicity stunt in "giving an average Joe a shot at the NFL".

Barney joins the Eagles, but at first isn't really accepted by his teammates, especially his roommate, Bubba Downs. But once Barney starts playing and makes a lot of important field goals, his teammates and football fans all over town begin to love him, giving him the nickname "G-Man". Unfortunately, the fame and popularity begin to go to Barney's head, and he becomes conceited and talks down to his teammates. In the next game, Barney misses a potential game-winning field goal, knocking the Eagles out of contention for the playoffs.

Barney goes to a bar, depressed and lonely, when an attractive blonde woman approaches him. She asks him if he is Barney Gorman and if she could take a picture with him. Barney is caught off guard when the woman kisses him as the photo is being taken. She says thanks while giving him an alluring smile as she walks away.

Barney's mood goes from bad to worse and he is suspended from the team. He misses a date with his wife (Jessica Tuck), who then sees the picture of him kissing the blonde woman in the newspaper. When Barney arrives at home, he finds that his wife has kicked him out as well, leaving his suitcase outside the door with the photo from the newspaper.

After some soul-searching, Barney comes to his senses and apologizes to his wife, son, father, and his teammates. The Eagles let him back on the team, just in time for the final game of the season. Barney is given a chance to redeem himself as the game again comes down to a last-second field goal. The holder fumbles the snap, and Barney grabs it and scores the game-winning touchdown. At the end-of-season press conference, Barney remembers his roots as a garbageman and points out that garbagemen are deserving of respect, too, as they work hard to keep the city clean.

Cast
Tony Danza as Barney Gorman
Jessica Tuck as Marie Gorman, Barney's wife
Art LaFleur as Gus Rogenheimer
Jaime Cardriche as Bubba
Al Ruscio as Mr. Gorman, Barney's father
Ray Wise as Randolph Pratt
Julie Stewart as Eagles Recruiter
Gil Filar as Danny Gorman, Barney & Marie's son

The cast also included many well known figures in the world of professional football playing minor roles or making cameo appearances. Jeffrey Lurie, the owner of the Philadelphia Eagles played Barney's friend who was seen at the cafe and had the line "This new Eagles owner must be a good guy."  The kicking stand-in for Tony Danza was Mike Vanderjagt, a Canadian football player and professional placekicker. The movie also featured sportscaster Chris Berman and NFL footage with Troy Aikman of the Dallas Cowboys.

Production
Most of the movie was actually filmed in Toronto, Ontario. Other filming locations for the movie included Hollywood, California and Philadelphia, Pennsylvania.

References

External links
 
 
 MUBI

American football films
Philadelphia Eagles
Publicity stunts in fiction
Films scored by Shirley Walker
Disney television films
1998 films
1990s American films